The Bauchi Emirate ( Fula: Lamorde Bauchi 𞤤𞤢𞤥𞤮𞤪𞤣𞤫 𞤦𞤢𞤵𞤷𞥅𞤭) was founded by Fula in the early 19th century in what is now Bauchi State, Nigeria, with its capital in Bauchi. The emirate came under British "protection" in the colonial era, and is now denoted a traditional state.

History
Before the Fulani jihad the Bauchi region was inhabited by a large number of small tribes, some of whom spoke languages related to Hausa, and some of whom were Muslims.
The province of Bauchi was conquered between 1809 and 1818 by Fula warriors led by one Yakubu gerawa, the son of a local  ruler who had been educated at Sokoto and had studied under Usman dan Fodio.

The emirate remained under Fula rule until 1902 when a British expedition occupied the capital without fighting. The British abolished the slave trade, which had flourished until then, and appointed a new emir, who died a few months later. In 1904 the emir who had succeeded took the oath of allegiance to the British crown.

Emirs
Rulers of the Bauchi state, titled Lamido, were:

References

History of Nigeria
Bauchi State
Nigerian traditional states
Emirates
1800s establishments in Nigeria